Nandhi is a 2002 Kannada-language action-drama film directed by D. Rajendra Babu featuring Sudeep, Sindhu Menon and Radhika Chaudhari in the lead roles. The film features background score and soundtrack composed by Gurukiran and lyrics by Kaviraj and V. Nagendra Prasad. The film released on 27 December 2002.

Cast
 Sudeep as Nandhi
 Sindhu Menon as Divya
 Radhika Chaudhari as Pinki
 Ashish Vidhyarthi as Dhanraj/Different Danny
 Ambika as Nandhi's mother
 Kashi as Professor
Vikas as Nandhi's friend
 Vaijanath Biradar as Bagni
 Shankar Ashwath as Police Officer
 Chikka Suresh
 Narendra Babu Sharma

Soundtrack

Awards

Filmfare Awards South :-
 Best Actor - Kannada (2002) - Sudeep

Karnataka State Film Awards :-
 Best Actor (2002) - Sudeep

References

External links
 

2002 action drama films
2002 films
Indian action drama films
2000s Kannada-language films
Films scored by Gurukiran
Films directed by D. Rajendra Babu